Agatti Airport  is a regional airport serving Agatti Island, in the union territory of Lakshadweep, India. It is located at the southern end of the island, and is the sole airstrip in the archipelago, which lies off the west coast of mainland India.

History
The airstrip was constructed during 1987−88 for operation of Dornier 228 type of aircraft and was inaugurated on 16 April 1988. Initially, the terminal was housed in a small temporary structure.
Construction of Terminal Building, Air Traffic Control Tower and related structures commenced in 2006. However, the construction of the Terminal Building was stopped midway due to the proposed extension of Runway & Basic strip.
Air India Regional began services with ATR-42 aircraft on 24 September 2010 connecting Agatti with Kochi.
The resurfacing of the runway was completed in November 2010. Alliance Air now operates ATR-72-600 aircraft on Bangalore-Cochin-Agatti sector

Structure
It has one asphalt runway, oriented 04/22, 1204 metres long and 30 metres wide, while its terminal building can handle 50 passengers during peak hours. Navigational aids include a DME and NDB. It is operated by the Airports Authority of India (AAI).

Expansion plans
In 2013, the Airports Authority of India (AAI) received environmental clearance to extend the runway by constructing a 1,500-feet-long bridge on stilts over the sea. The extension is to be built at a cost of Rs 3 billion and will allow aircraft like the ATR-72 to be operated without any payload restrictions.
AAI originally planned to construct a bridge between Agatti and the neighbouring uninhabited Kalpati Island to make the runway long enough to handle an Airbus A320 or Boeing 737. However, this plan was rejected on environmental grounds as the bridge would have gone through a turtle colony and Kalpati island would need to be leveled to accommodate the extended runway.

As per the revised master plan, the following works will be undertaken:
 The existing runway will be extended by 336 metres in the south-west direction over the lagoon towards Kalpati Island without interconnecting the two islands.
 Construction of new Terminal building, ATC tower cum Technical block & Fire Station in the north-west direction by constructing a platform supported by R.C.C pillars on the lagoon.
 A fully air-conditioned Terminal building covering 2250 square metres to cater for 150 passengers at a time (75 arriving and 75 departing).
 The existing Control Tower cum fire station and existing Terminal building that falls inside of the proposed basic strip will be demolished.
 A new 118×62-metre apron suitable for parking two ATR-72 aircraft with power-in and power-out configuration will be constructed on a platform supported by RCC pillars in the lagoon.
 Runway End Safety Area (RESA) measuring 60×90 metres and a Blast Pad/Overrun area measuring 60×30 metres.
 73-metre long taxiway from the Runway to the Apron.
 Proposed DVOR and NDB navigational aids will be placed on Kalpati island.

Airlines and destinations

References

External links 

Agatti Airport at the Airports Authority of India

Airports in Lakshadweep
Airports established in 1988
1988 establishments in Lakshadweep
20th-century architecture in India